Tror du jag ljuger? (Swedish: Do you think I am lying?) is a Swedish comedy panel show made by Brommamamma AB for Sveriges Television first aired on March 19, 2016 and is based on the British original Would I Lie to You?.

In the show there are two teams with three panelists each. The panelists take turns to tell about different characteristics about themselves and events in their life whilst the opposite team have to guess whether these stories are true or false. The show is hosted by Anna Mannheimer and the constant team leaders are Fredrik Lindström and Johan Glans.

Transmissions

Notes

References 

Swedish comedy television series